Henrietta Maria King (née Chamberlain; July 21, 1832 – March 31, 1925) was a rancher and philanthropist. She was the wife of Richard King, who founded King Ranch, the largest ranch in Texas. Their daughter Alice Gertrudis King Kleberg is the namesake of Alice, Texas.

The Henrietta M. King High School in Kingsville, Texas is named after her.

References 

1832 births
1925 deaths
American philanthropists
People from Boonville, Missouri